Royal County Down Golf Club is a golf club in Northern Ireland, located in Newcastle, County Down. It opened on 23 March 1889 and is one of the oldest golf clubs in Ireland. It has two 18-hole links courses, the Championship Course and the Annesley Links.

Significant tournaments
Royal County Down has made outstanding contributions to Irish golf from the Club's beginnings, hosting many important tournaments, starting soon after it opened, and continuing to the present day. Notably, the Club in 2007 became just the second Irish venue, after Portmarnock, to host the Walker Cup. The Irish Open on the European Tour took place in late May in 2015, returning to Royal County Down after 76 years. It previously hosted the event three times, all prior to World War II.  The British Ladies Amateur Golf Championship were held on the course in June 2019.
 
Senior British Open Championship: 2000 (winner: Christy O'Connor Jnr), 2001 (winner: Ian Stanley) and 2002 (winner: Noboru Sugai).
The Amateur Championship: 1970 (winner: Michael Bonallack) and 1999 (winner: Graeme Storm).
British Ladies Amateur Golf Championship: 1899 (winner: May Hezlet), 1907 (winner: May Hezlet), 1920 (winner: Cecil Leitch), 1927 (winner: Simone de la Chaume), 1935 (winner: Wanda Morgan), 1950 (winner: Vicomtesse de St Sauveur), 1963 (winner: Brigitte Varangot) and 2006 (winner: Belén Mozo).
Curtis Cup: 1968 United States defeated Great Britain & Ireland, 10.5 to 7.5.
Walker Cup: 2007 United States defeated Great Britain & Ireland, 12.5 to 11.5.
Palmer Cup: 2012 Europe defeated United States, 13½ to 10½.
Irish Open: 1928, 1935, 2015
European Ladies' Team Championship: 2021

History
Royal County Down Golf Club secured 2nd place in golfscape's World's Top 100 Golf Course ranking 2020.

Scorecard

See also
 List of golf clubs granted Royal status
 Royal Portrush Golf Club
 Portstewart Golf Club

References

External links
 
 
 Golf Club Atlas

Organisations based in the United Kingdom with royal patronage
Golf clubs and courses in Northern Ireland
Sports clubs in County Down
Curtis Cup venues
Walker Cup venues
Golf clubs and courses designed by Harry Colt
1889 establishments in Ireland
Irish Open (golf) venues
Royal golf clubs